Lesser Kurils Zakaznik (Russian: Малые Курилы) is a federal-level Zakaznik or "State Nature Preserve" in the disputed Lesser Kuril Chain, administered by Sakhalin Oblast, Russia, but also formally part of Nemuro Subprefecture, Japan. The preserve was established in 1983, in accordance with the Japan-Soviet Joint Communiqué of 10 October 1973.

Description
The Zakaznik encompasses areas of Shikotan in addition to Anuchina, Tanfiliev Island, Yuri, and Zelyony in the Habomai Islands. The protected marine zone extends to one nautical mile from the coast. The Zakaznik helps conserve marine mammals (including cetaceans, Steller sea lions (Eumetopias jubatus), Western Pacific harbor seals (Phoca vitulina stejnegeri), and sea otters (Enhydra lutris), as well as the Shikotan vole (Clethrionomys rex), red-crowned crane (Grus japonensis), colonies of seabirds, wintering waterfowl, and local plant communities.

See also

 List of protected areas of Russia (Sakhalin Oblast)

References

Kuril Islands
Protected areas of the Russian Far East
Protected areas established in 1983
1983 establishments in Russia